Regulator of cell cycle RGCC (RGCC) also known as response gene to complement 32 protein (RGC-32) is a protein that in humans is encoded by the RGCC gene.

Function 

This gene is thought to regulate cell cycle progression. It is induced by p53 in response to DNA damage, or by sublytic levels of complement system proteins that result in activation of the cell cycle. The encoded protein localizes to the cytoplasm during interphase and to centrosomes during mitosis. The protein forms a complex with polo-like kinase 1. The protein also translocates to the nucleus in response to treatment with complement system proteins, and can associate with and increase the kinase activity of cell division cycle 2 protein. In different assays and cell types, overexpression of this protein has been shown to activate or suppress cell cycle progression.

References

Further reading